Las Vegas Stallions were an American soccer club. They played in the National Premier Soccer League. They were one of the main soccer clubs in Las Vegas, Nevada. Piggott Memorial Stadium was their venue. It has a capacity of 3,000 people. The Las Vegas Stallions withdrew from the NPSL and folded in 2014.

Year-by-year

External links
 https://web.archive.org/web/20130914183714/http://www.lvstallionsfc.com/
 https://web.archive.org/web/20130307131910/http://www.nationalpremiersoccerleague.com/index.html

References

Soccer clubs in Nevada
Association football clubs established in 2010
National Premier Soccer League teams
Association football clubs disestablished in 2014
2014 disestablishments in Nevada
Sports teams in Las Vegas